Shooting at the 2010 Summer Youth Olympics, as approved by the International Shooting Sport Federation, comprised 10 metre air rifle and 10 metre air pistol, each for boys (60 shots) and girls (40 shots), with 80 competitors altogether. For each of the four events, a total of twenty NOCs qualified and participated with one competitor each.

The continental confederations of ISSF organized special qualifying competitions for shooters born in 1992 and 1993. The minimum qualification scores (MQS) have been set at 552 / 368 (60 shots boys / 40 shots girls) for air rifle and at 540 / 355 (60 shots boys / 40 shots girls) for air pistol. In comparison, the "adult" MQS for the 2008 Beijing Summer Olympics were air rifle 570 / 375 and air pistol 563 / 365 respectively.

1 In the girls' air rifle and the boys' air pistol competitions, one of these spots is reserved for the host country, Singapore.

Qualified Athletes

Boys 10m Air Pistol

 Romik Vardumyan
 Janek Janski
 Aliaksei Horbach
 Felipe Almeida Wu
 Solomon Borisov
 Jia Ziayong
 Jindřich Dubový
 Raef Tawfik Mohamed
 Vincent Jeanningros
 Philipp Kaefer
 Csaba Bartók
 Sepehr Saffariboroujeni
 Choi Dae-han
 Julio Nava
 Stefan Rares Ion
 Nikolay Kilin
 Wu Wenyi
 Elia Andruccioli
 Tien Shao-Chien
 Denys Kushnirov

Girls 10m Air Pistol

 Emily Esposito
 Kseniya Faminykh
 Danielle Marcotte
 Fang Xue
 Valentina Pereglin
 Sarka Jonakova
 Hala Abdel Rahman
 Geraldine Solórzano Manson
 Ruchi Singh
 Yasaman Heidari
 Chiara Marini
 Kim Jang-mi
 Mariana Nava
 Dijana Petrova
 Alexandra Silvia Morar
 Ekaterina Barsukova
 Eliane Dohner
 Kanokkan Chaimongkol
 Lenara Asanova
 Thi Ngoc Duong Nguyen

Boys 10m Air Rifle

 John Coombes
 Stefan Rumpler
 Illia Charheika
 Zeng Yi
 Tiziano Suran
 Petr Plechac
 Hossam Salah Eldeen
 Jaakko Bjorkbacka
 Alexander Thomas
 Elvin Aroldo Lopez Calderon
 István Kapás
 Navdeep Singh Rathore
 Simon Weithaler
 Irshat Avkhadiyev
 Kim Yong
 Erick Arzate Marchan
 Egor Maksimov
 Jan Lochbihler
 Salem Matar Ali Alqaydi
 Serhiy Kulish

Girls 10m Air Rifle

Competition schedule

Medal summary

Medal table

Events

References

Qualification System – 1st Summer Youth Olympic Games in 2010: Shooting. International Shooting Sport Federation, 27 November 2008.
ESC calendar for 2010

 
2010 Summer Youth Olympics events
Youth Summer Olympics
2010
Shooting competitions in Singapore